The Seabrook Bridge (officially the Senator Ted Hickey Bridge) is a medium-rise twin bascule, four-lane roadway bridge in New Orleans, Louisiana, carrying Lakeshore Drive, connecting Leon C. Simon Drive on the upper side of the bridge with Hayne Boulevard on the lower side.  The bridge is operated by the Orleans Levee District.  It normally stays in the down position for vehicular traffic, but provides sufficient clearance for most marine traffic.

References 

Bridges in New Orleans
Bascule bridges in the United States
Road bridges in Louisiana